Grange Hill is a 1987 video game published by Argus Press Software for the Commodore 64, ZX Spectrum, and Amstrad CPC.  It is based on Grange Hill, a popular children's television show. The music was done by David Whittaker, but did not include the TV show's theme tune.

The Commodore 64 version was coded by Michael Delves.

Plot
The game's protagonist is Luke "Gonch" Gardener, with Paul "Hollo" Holloway as an assistant (see the list of pupils in Grange Hill). The object of the game is to retrieve Gonch's personal stereo from the school after hours, which his teacher confiscated.

References

1987 video games
Amstrad CPC games
Commodore 64 games
ZX Spectrum games
Video games based on television series
Video games scored by David Whittaker
Video games developed in the United Kingdom

Video games about the illegal drug trade
Bug-Byte Software games
School-themed video games
Single-player video games